Golgo 13: The Professional, known as simply  in Japan, is a 1983 Japanese animated action film based on the manga series Golgo 13 by Takao Saito. The film was directed by Osamu Dezaki, produced by Yutaka Fujioka and Mata Yamamoto and was written from a screenplay by Shukei Nagasaka. It is the first animated film based on the manga, and the third overall Golgo 13 film after two previous live-action films (the second film starring Sonny Chiba as Golgo 13).

Upon its original Japanese theatrical release, Golgo 13: The Professional was the first feature-length animated film to incorporate CGI animation, used in a helicopter action sequence. The film was later released in North America by Streamline Pictures in 1992. The Streamline release received mixed reviews from American critics at the time, with praise for the animation design but criticism towards the story, dubbing and adult content.

Plot
Professional contract killer Duke Togo—codenamed "Golgo 13"—is hired to assassinate Robert Dawson, the son of oil baron Leonard Dawson and the heir of Dawson Enterprises, and succeeds. Later, after accomplishing a hit on a powerful crime boss in Sicily named Dr. Z, Golgo is suddenly attacked by the U.S. Military and CIA. His local contact, a clockmaker, is also murdered by a genetically enhanced supersoldier named Snake. Aided by the Pentagon, the FBI, and the CIA, Dawson has become determined to kill Golgo and avenge his son's death.

A military force, led by Lieutenant Bob Bragan, attempts to ambush Golgo while he is in the middle of an assignment from a wealthy Holocaust survivor in San Francisco, California to assassinate an ex-Nazi official. The plan fails, and Bragan's entire force is wiped out. However, a dying Bragan manages to wound Golgo. Meanwhile, Rita, the mechanic that supplied Golgo with his getaway car, is murdered by Snake.

Having been consumed by revenge, Dawson begins to allow the rest of his family to be harmed. To secure Snake's cooperation, he allows him to rape Robert's widow, Laura. Dawson also sends his granddaughter, Emily, and butler, Albert, to an airport to murder Golgo with a firearm concealed in a doll. The shot misses, and Albert reaches for his handgun. Golgo shoots Albert in the chest, a crowd gathers, and Golgo walks away nonchalantly.

Dawson, in a meeting with the FBI, the CIA and the Pentagon, demands the release of Gold and Silver, two notorious murderers who were part of a covert government operation to test the survival rate of mercenaries in the jungles of South America. When the group refuses his request because Gold and Silver are on death row, Dawson threatens to halt all operations that his company controls, which include oil refineries and banks. The group acquiesces to his demands in fear that the economy of the country will collapse. When Laura demands to know why Dawson has refused to seek vengeance on whoever ordered the hit on Robert, he refuses to answer.

Pablo, an informant for Golgo, informs him that Dawson ordered the hit on him, and that he's currently in Dawson's tower awaiting his advance. Pablo goes on to inform Golgo that his wife and children are being kept at ransom in the tower. Pablo attempts to shoot Golgo, but is killed by Golgo first.

Golgo arrives at Dawson Tower in New York City, and begins his ascent to the top floor on foot. He first plays a game of cat and mouse with a fleet of helicopter gunships sent to kill him. While on the move, Golgo is attacked by Snake, and a brutal knifefight occurs between the two in an elevator, during which Snake manages to stab Golgo. A Bell AH-1 attack helicopter shoots the elevator, killing Snake while Golgo hides by the edge unseen by the helicopter. Gold and Silver are then sent to ambush Golgo. During the attack, Golgo counters both of them. As Gold reopens one of Golgo's prior stab wounds, Golgo bludgeons Gold on the head repeatedly with the butt of his revolver and shoots him. Silver, blinded by rage at his partner's death, rushes at Golgo, who quickly stuffs a grenade in Silver's mouth, which kills him. Golgo then proceeds towards Dawson.

Admitting failure, Dawson orders all action against Golgo to end. Golgo finally encounters Dawson at the top of his building. Following a brief monologue, Dawson attempts suicide by leaping out of the window. As he falls, Dawson remembers Robert's suicide note, which reveals that, despite receiving much care from his father throughout his lifetime, Robert was overcome with grief over the possibility that he would never fulfill his father's ambitions; unable to commit suicide, he requested that Golgo kill him. Before Dawson hits the ground, Golgo shoots him in the head. Dawson falls headfirst, crushing his skull and any evidence that he was shot. His death is ruled as accidental by the authorities.

Afterwards, Golgo encounters Laura, who has since become a prostitute. Trying to get the attention of men as they pass her by, she grabs a man's arm; when he turns to face her, she is stunned upon recognizing him. She eventually draws a pistol and aims it at Golgo, but when she hesitates to fire, he turns his back to her and walks away. Laura finally proceeds to shoot; the shot rings out and the scene fades. Golgo walks away into the night before the credits roll.

Cast

Production
The film features the voice acting of Tetsurō Sagawa, Gorō Naya, Toshiko Fujita, Kōsei Tomita, Kiyoshi Kobayashi and Reiko Mutō. The film was released by Toho-Towa on May 28, 1983.

Golgo 13: The Professional is also the first animated film to incorporate CGI animation, created by Koichi Omura and Satomi Mikuriya at Toyo Links Co., Ltd. This is most notable in a scene where army helicopters circle around Dawson Tower and attack Golgo as he climbs toward Dawson's office on the top floor. The CGI scene was created by Koichi Omura (大村皓一 Ōmura Kōichi) and Satomi Mikuriya (御厨 さと美 Mikuriya Satomi) at Toyo Links Co., Ltd. (トーヨーリンクス Tōyō Rinkusu).

Reception 
The film received largely mixed reviews from American film critics when it was screened in America by Streamline Pictures in 1992. The film was praised by Boston Globe writer Betsy Sherman who cited the animation, visual style, and English dubbing as draws. However, The New York Times reviewer Janet Maslin was highly critical of the film, noting its excessive violence and a scene of sexual assault. She was also critical of the dialogue, writing, and story of the film. LA Weekly was also critical of both the film, calling Golgo himself "2 dimensional", and the story as "cookie cutter" while saying that the film lacked the humanizing elements that Lone Wolf and Cub did. Newsday critic Gene Seymore gave it 2 1/2 stars. Philadelphia Inquirer reviewer Steven Rea called the film a disappointing adaption of the original comic, citing stiff animation and dialogue, with only the excessive violence being the only element that someone might find appealing.

Several reviewers compared the film to live-action film Die Hard (1988) starring Bruce Willis. Bob Strauss gave the film just one star out of four, saying the film was "amateurish", and that it lacked the exotic or fantastical elements seen in other Japanese animated films. Charles Solomon in The Los Angeles Times was also critical of the film, citing Golgo 13 as an "emotional void" on the film because he remained expressionless regardless of the situation whether it's frantic action or love making.

The 1996 movie guide "Seen That, Now What?", it was given the rating of "B", stating it to be "a sprawling chrime thriller laced with liberal amounts of sex and graphic violence, marked by stylized design, extreme camera angles, and unpredictable plot twists."

Retrospectively, Dave Halverson praised the film following its release on DVD in 2005, calling the film slickly made and entertaining.

In popular culture
Quentin Tarantino paid homage to the Golgo 13 anime in the animated sequence of Kill Bill: Volume 1 (2003).

References

External links
 
 

Professional
1983 anime films
Anime films based on manga
Japanese films about revenge
Japanese action films
Animated films about revenge
Japanese films set in New York City
Animated films set in San Francisco
Films set in Sicily
1980s Japanese-language films
TMS Entertainment
Discotek Media
Films directed by Osamu Dezaki
Animated films set in New York City
Foreign films set in the United States